Varangerhalvøya National Park lies on the Varanger Peninsula in Troms og Finnmark county, Norway.  It is located in the municipalities of Båtsfjord, Nesseby, Vadsø, and Vardø, in the northeasternmost part of Norway. The peninsula was earlier the largest area within the Arctic climate zone in mainland Norway, but with the 1991-2020 normals, much of the area is boreal rather than arctic. Much of the area is still alpine tundra.

Flora and fauna
Since species from the Arctic, eastern Siberia, and more southerly areas all occur together on the Varanger Peninsula, the plant life is distinctive. The small deciduous woodlands in the area are among the northernmost in the world.

Lime-rich bedrock and soil in the north supports rich pockets containing rare species like Papaver dahlianum (a poppy), field fleawort, Svalbard snow cinquefoil , and Arenaria pseudofrigida (a sandwort).

The peninsula still has a complete alpine ecosystem with reindeer (domesticated), wolverine, and Arctic fox. The latter is the most endangered mammal species of Norway. A special programme based on reducing the number of the dominant red fox has shown very good results (per 2008) for the small Arctic fox population.

Important Bird Area
An area of about 200,000 ha of the peninsula, largely coinciding with the national park, has been designated an Important Bird Area (IBA) by BirdLife International because it supports breeding populations of many birds, including lesser white-fronted geese, long-tailed ducks, common scoters, greater scaups, Eurasian golden plovers, bar-tailed godwits, ruddy turnstones, Temminck's stints, dunlins, purple sandpipers, little stints, red-necked phalaropes, spotted redshanks, long-tailed jaegers, Arctic jaegers, pomarine jaegers, short-eared owls, snowy owls, rough-legged buzzards, gyrfalcons, red-throated pipits, lapland longspurs and snow buntings.

Name
The last element is the finite form of halvøy ("peninsula"). The meaning of the first part of the name is originally the name of a fjord, (Old Norse: Ver(j)angr).  The first part is ver meaning "fishing village" and the last part is angr which means "fjord".

References

National parks of Norway
Protected areas established in 2006
Protected areas of Troms og Finnmark
Tourist attractions in Troms og Finnmark
Important Bird Areas of Norway
Important Bird Areas of the Arctic
2006 establishments in Norway
Båtsfjord
Vardø
Vadsø
Nesseby